South Hylton is a Tyne and Wear Metro station, serving the suburbs of Pennywell and South Hylton, City of Sunderland in Tyne and Wear, North East England. It joined the network as a terminus station on 31 March 2002, following the opening of the extension from Pelaw to South Hylton.

Original station
South Hylton stands to the east of the site of the former Hylton station, which was located west of Hylton Bank. The station opened on 1 June 1853, as part of the Penshaw branch of the York, Newcastle and Berwick Railway. Passenger services along the Penshaw Branch were recommended for withdrawal in the Beeching Report, and the station duly closed on 4 May 1964.

Prior to the opening of the Tyne and Wear Metro station, the area was served by the Jolly Bus service, operated by W.H. Jolly. The service ran from Claxheugh Road and Evesham in South Hylton to Sunderland, using vehicles branded in a cream and brown livery. The service was withdrawn in July 1995.

Metro era
Because of this, the single platform is officially recognised as two platforms, and can accommodate two trains.

Along with other stations on the line between Fellgate and South Hylton, the station is fitted with vitreous enamel panels designed by artist, Morag Morrison. Each station uses a different arrangement of colours, with strong colours used in platform shelters and ticketing areas, and a more neutral palate for external elements.

The station was used by 256,819 passengers in 2017–18, making it the eighth-most-used station on the Wearside extension.

Facilities 
Step-free access is available at all stations across the Tyne and Wear Metro network, with ramped access to the platform at South Hylton. The station is equipped with ticket machines, waiting shelter, seating, next train information displays, timetable posters, and an emergency help point. Ticket machines are able to accept payment with credit and debit card (including contactless payment), notes and coins. The station is also fitted with smartcard validators, which feature at all stations across the network.

A small, free car park is available, with 24 parking spaces, plus two accessible spaces, as well as a taxi rank. There is also the provision for cycle parking, with five cycle pods available for use.

Services 
, the station is served by up to five trains per hour on weekdays and Saturday, and up to four trains per hour during the evening and on Sunday.

Rolling stock used: Class 599 Metrocar

References

External links
 
Timetable and station information for South Hylton

Sunderland
2002 establishments in England
Railway stations in Great Britain opened in 2002
Tyne and Wear Metro Green line stations
Transport in the City of Sunderland
Transport in Tyne and Wear
